AutoAlliance may refer to:

 AutoAlliance International, an automobile assembly plant in Flat Rock, Michigan
 AutoAlliance Thailand, an automobile assembly firm in Rayong Province, Thailand

See also
 Alliance of Automobile Manufacturers, a former trade group of U.S. automobile manufacturers